Arturo Zablah Khuri (San Salvador, El Salvador, 1954) is an engineer and Salvadoran politician of Palestinian origin.

He graduated from the University of Monterrey in Mexico, with a degree in industrial engineering in 1976. Zablah then earned a master's degree in Systems Analysis at the Georgia Institute of Technology in the United States, in 1981 .

He has worked as an industrial engineer and consultant to large manufacturing companies. He was appointed Minister of Foreign Trade of 1989, then served as Minister of Economy in the government of Alfredo Cristiani (1989-1994), and was president of the Autonomous Executive Port Commission of El Salvador (CEPA) (1994-1998) during the presidency of Armando Calderon Sol (1994-1999).

In the Salvadoran presidential election in 2009, he was a candidate for Vice President of the Republic of El Salvador for the right-wing ARENA party, having Rodrigo Ávila as the presidential nominee.

External links
 http://luterano.blogspot.com.au/2007/10/arturo-zablah-presidential-candidate.html

1954 births
Living people
People from San Salvador
Salvadoran Roman Catholics
Salvadoran people of Palestinian descent
Nationalist Republican Alliance politicians
Georgia Tech alumni
21st-century Algerian people